Weberg is the surname of the following people
Anders Weberg, Swedish director
Charlie Weberg (born 1998), Swedish footballer
Dag C. Weberg (born 1937), Norwegian politician

See also
Weberg Formation, geologic formation in Oregon